Maryna Sergeevna Ilyinskaya (born 13 March 1999) is a Ukrainian badminton player from Kharkov badminton club. In 2017, she won the girls' singles silver medal at the European Junior Championships. She won her first senior international title at the 2017 Czech International tournament in the women's doubles event partnered with Yelyzaveta Zharka.

Achievements

European Junior Championships 
Girls' singles

BWF International Challenge/Series 
Women's singles

Women's doubles

  BWF International Challenge tournament
  BWF International Series tournament
  BWF Future Series tournament

References

External links 
 

Living people
1999 births
Ukrainian female badminton players
Badminton players at the 2019 European Games
European Games competitors for Ukraine
21st-century Ukrainian women